Mustang Peak may refer to the following summits:

 Mustang Peak (Coast Mountains, Alaska), in the Coast Mountains
 Mustang Peak (Mustang Mountains, Arizona), in the Mustang Mountains
 Mustang Peak (Monterey County, California), in the Diablo Range
 Mustang Peak (Stanislaus County, California), in the Diablo Range